Neil Allen Balme (born 15 January 1952) is a former Australian rules footballer who played for the Richmond Football Club in the Victorian Football League (VFL), as well as for the Subiaco Football Club in the Western Australian National Football League (WANFL) and the Norwood Football Club in the South Australian National Football League (SANFL).

Throughout his involvement in football, as a player, coach and administrator, Balme has experienced premiership success across a number of clubs.

Playing career
Balme was one of three brothers, the others being Ian and Craig, to play League football. As a player, Balme was one of football's wild men, a man mountain who often threw his weight around resulting in many tribunal appearances. But he was also a skilled, thoughtful footballer who could take a strong, contested mark and boot the ball long distances. After retiring, he built a reputation as a football coach and later administrator that highlighted his innovative thinking about the game.

Balme played his junior football with Wembley Athletic Club, after leaving Mount Pleasant Amateurs, before transferring to Western Australian Football League (WAFL) club Subiaco in 1968. Aged just 16, Balme created a huge impression with a strong performance in the ruck against future Australian Football Hall of Famer Graham "Polly" Farmer in a game against West Perth Football Club. In January 1969, he moved to Melbourne with his family. He was quickly enticed to sign with Richmond along with his older brother Ian Balme.

It was a riches back to rags situation after the move. The Tigers believed that the youngster needed some rounding to his still raw game. Balme found himself playing at thirds (under 19) level with the Tigers. At season's end, he played in the team's third consecutive premiership under famous junior coach, Ray Jordon. In 1970, Balme continued his development with the Tiger reserves, and broke through for three senior games late in the year.

At this point, Richmond were in the process of generational change in the team after two premierships in the late 1960s. The club demanded strong, vigorous ruck players and identified the potential in Balme to continue the tradition. He was a team regular in 1971 as a forward/relief ruckman and performed well on the big stage during the Tigers' finals matches.

Balme stood out with his height, big physique, long, flowing hair and penchant for throwing his weight around. For 1972, the club recruited another player in a similar mould in Carlton's Ricky McLean, who played next to Balme at full forward. The duo booted a combined total of 110 goals for the season and created terror among opposing defenders with their vigorous approach to the game. Balme was less effective in the finals, saving his best game for the Grand Final when he booted five goals in a losing performance against Carlton. He also provided several goals for teammates with intelligent tap-ons, hit outs and shepherds, an under-emphasised aspect of his game.

Twelve months later, Balme and his teammates fronted the same opposition in the 1973 VFL Grand Final, determined to avenge their shock loss. Richmond started well, and in the second quarter began to dominate the game. Balme instigated two incidents during this period that remain controversial to this day. Firstly, he threw a round arm punch into the jaw of his opponent, Carlton full back Geoff Southby. Although Southby was able to regain his feet after slumping to the ground, he had severe concussion and was replaced by a reserve at half time. Minutes later, Balme launched a flurry of punches at Carlton's Vin Waite during a scramble for the ball in the Richmond goalsquare. This sparked a small melee as the two teams converged on Balme and Waite. The umpire had a good sight of the incident and reported Balme, who was later suspended. It mattered little to the Tigers, who went on to win the game by five goals and annexe their third flag in seven years. But the club didn't escape criticism that they planned the two incidents before the game. Richmond players and officials have always defended Balme's actions, claiming that there was no way Balme premeditated his attacks on the Carlton players.

After serving his suspension early the following season, Balme returned to the side and was one of the driving forces behind the Tigers' performance in finishing on top of the ladder. He played well in the finals and aged 22 was a premiership player for the second time. Balme confirmed his status as a big-game performer in the 1975 finals, when Richmond finished third. By now, Balme was at the peak of his game and had a real presence on the field. Although, at 193 cm, he was often conceding height to other ruckman, he was surprisingly mobile and agile and never beaten in a one-on-one physical confrontation.

Richmond then lost a number of ruckman, allowing Balme to play more football on the ball and he was appointed vice captain of the club for the 1976 VFL season. Balme had his best-ever season in 1977, finishing second in Richmond's Best and Fairest award, the Jack Dyer Medal, and was chosen to play for his native Western Australia in the first state of origin match in October. Unfortunately, his finals campaign was hindered by a late season suspension, causing him to miss the first week of the finals. The following week he returned, only to be stymied by his North Melbourne opposition, who made a last-minute switch to his opponent that left Balme and his teammates off-guard. Richmond lost the match convincingly and were eliminated.

After a solid season in 1978, Balme's career suddenly curtailed the following year. He had missed just seven games in the preceding four seasons, but suffered his first major injury when he hurt his knee. Restricted to just two games for the year and usurped as first ruckman at Richmond by Mark Lee, Balme shocked the club when he accepted life membership and then retired from the game, aged only 27. Balme then shifted to South Australia, where he was snapped up by South Australian National Football League (SANFL) club Norwood as coach.

Coaching career
Balme's stint at Norwood lasted eleven seasons during which his team never missed the finals. They won premierships in 1982 and 1984, earning Balme an excellent reputation and several overtures to return to Victoria and coach. Richmond were among the suitors for his talents. But Balme felt that the game was stagnating in its home state, dragged down by an emphasis on negativity and physicality. He encouraged a fast, open and skilful passing game that he believed was the future of the code.

In 1991, Balme left Norwood and became the inaugural coach of the new Woodville-West Torrens Football Club, formed from the merger of Woodville and West Torrens at the end of 1990. His success there proved that a merged entity could work at a time when AFL clubs were facing the prospect of merger to stay viable in the new, fully professional era. Eventually, he succumbed to the lure of coaching in the AFL and was appointed to lead Melbourne Football Club for the 1993 AFL season.

Balme's persistence with a strategic, high-possession, low-impact game plan earned both praise and ridicule. When the style succeeded it was attractive and hard to counter. However, when broken down by intense tackling, the players (and the coach) could look foolish and inept. Melbourne made it all way to the preliminary final in 1994, but struggled thereafter. Melbourne's poor record from 1995 on was due in part to injury to stars including Garry Lyon, David Schwarz, and Stephen Tingay. Balme's reasoned, personable style and his insistence on player self-empowerment made him very media-friendly, but some questioned whether he was suited to coaching in the AFL.

Balme and his players were caught in the turmoil surrounding the club's proposal to merge with Hawthorn Football Club in 1996. The team slumped and after a number of embarrassing performances in 1997, Balme was sacked after Round 9 and eight successive losses by the controversial new Demons president, Joe Gutnick. He was replaced by Greg Hutchison for the rest of the season.

Statistics

Playing statistics

|- style="background-color: #EAEAEA"
! scope="row" style="text-align:center" | 1970
|
| 21 || 3 || 8 || 3 || 19 || 11 || 30 || 7 ||  || 11 || 2.7 || 1.0 || 6.3 || 3.7 || 10.0 || 2.3 ||  || 3.7 || 0
|- 
! scope="row" style="text-align:center" | 1971
|
| 21 || 17 || 28 || 19 || 150 || 34 || 184 || 71 ||  || 34 || 1.6 || 1.1 || 8.8 || 2.0 || 10.8 || 4.2 ||  || 2.0 || 0
|- style="background-color: #EAEAEA"
! scope="row" style="text-align:center" | 1972
|
| 21 || 20 || 55 || 30 || 150 || 35 || 185 || 73 ||  || 59 || 2.8 || 1.5 || 7.5 || 1.8 || 9.3 || 3.7 ||  || 3.7 || 2
|- 
|style="text-align:center;background:#afe6ba;"|1973†
|
| 21 || 13 || 34 || 28 || 88 || 35 || 123 || 47 ||  || 25 || 2.6 || 2.2 || 6.8 || 2.7 || 9.5 || 3.6 ||  || 1.9 || 1
|- style="background-color: #EAEAEA"
|style="text-align:center;background:#afe6ba;"|1974†
|
| 21 || 18 || 37 || 21 || 170 || 90 || 260 || 80 ||  || 7 || 2.1 || 1.2 || 9.4 || 5.0 || 14.4 || 4.4 ||  || 7.0 || 0
|- 
! scope="row" style="text-align:center" | 1975
|
| 21 || 25 || 24 || 21 || 225 || 113 || 338 || 114 ||  || 133 || 1.0 || 0.8 || 9.4 || 4.7 || 14.1 || 4.8 ||  || 11.1 || 0
|- style="background-color: #EAEAEA"
! scope="row" style="text-align:center" | 1976
|
| 21 || 21 || 18 || 13 || 193 || 95 || 288 || 97 ||  || 156 || 0.9 || 0.6 || 9.2 || 4.5 || 13.7 || 4.6 ||  || 7.4 || 0
|- 
! scope="row" style="text-align:center" | 1977
|
| 21 || 22 || 12 || 9 || 233 || 204 || 437 || 118 ||  || 352 || 0.5 || 0.4 || 10.6 || 9.3 || 19.9 || 5.4 ||  || 16.0 || 10
|- style="background-color: #EAEAEA"
! scope="row" style="text-align:center" | 1978
|
| 21 || 18 || 13 || 6 || 119 || 115 || 234 || 51 ||  || 175 || 0.7 || 0.3 || 6.6 || 6.4 || 13.0 || 2.8 ||  || 10.3 || 3
|- 
! scope="row" style="text-align:center" | 1979
|
| 21 || 2 || 0 || 1 || 4 || 4 || 8 || 2 ||  || 1 || 0.0 || 0.5 || 2.0 || 2.0 || 4.0 || 1.0 ||  || 0.5 || 0
|- class="sortbottom"
! colspan=3| Career
! 159
! 229
! 151
! 1351
! 736
! 2087
! 660
! 
! 953
! 1.4
! 0.9
! 8.6
! 4.7
! 13.2
! 4.2
! 
! 7.5
! 16
|}

Coaching statistics

|- style="background-color: #EAEAEA"
! scope="row" style="text-align:center; font-weight:normal" | 1993
|style="text-align:center;"|
| 20 || 10 || 10 || 0 || 50.0% || 10 || 15
|-
! scope="row" style="text-align:center; font-weight:normal" | 1994
|style="text-align:center;"|
| 25 || 14 || 11 || 0 || 56.0% || 7 || 15
|- style="background-color: #EAEAEA"
! scope="row" style="text-align:center; font-weight:normal" | 1995
|style="text-align:center;"|
| 22 || 9 || 13 || 0 || 40.9% || 9 || 16
|-
! scope="row" style="text-align:center; font-weight:normal" | 1996
|style="text-align:center;"|
| 22 || 7 || 15 || 0 || 31.8% || 14 || 16
|- style="background-color: #EAEAEA"
! scope="row" style="text-align:center; font-weight:normal" | 1997*
|style="text-align:center;"|
| 9 || 1 || 8 || 0 || 11.1% || 16 || 16
|- style="background-color: #EAEAEA"
|- class="sortbottom"
! colspan=2| Career totals
! 98
! 41
! 57
! 0
! 41.8%
! colspan=2|
|}

* Replaced by caretaker coach Greg Hutchison.

Football administrator
Balme found a position more suited to his personality when he was appointed football operations manager at the struggling Collingwood in 1998. In 2000, he was joined by former Richmond teammate Mick Malthouse (as coach) as part of an ambitious plan to lift the ailing Magpies up the ladder. Balme's calm, rational demeanour and casual style proved to be a great foil to Malthouse's more intense and temperamental character and the team made it to the 2002 and 2003 AFL Grand Finals, only to lose both matches to the Brisbane Lions.

Surprisingly, Balme was moved sideways by Collingwood at the end of the 2006 AFL season and he opted to accept an offer from Geelong Football Club to act as football operations manager in 2007, for the Cats, the year in which the club won its first Premiership in 44 years.  The success at Geelong continued throughout his tenure, with two more Premierships (2009, 2011) and a Grand Final appearance (2008).
After eight years at Geelong, Balme was offered and accepted the newly created director of coaching role with Collingwood at the end of 2014.

In his first year Richmond went on to win 2017 Premiership, breaking a 37-year drought. This drought breaking performance by the Richmond Football Club was backed up by a minor premiership in 2018 then going on to win another two AFL premierships in 2019–2020 seasons.

See also
 List of Western Australian State of Origin footballers

Notes

References
 1971 Tiger Year Book – Richmond Football Club
 Hogan P: The Tigers of Old, Richmond FC, (Melbourne), 1996.

External links
 Neil Allen Balme, at WAFL Footy Facts.
 
 
 
 
 Geelong Football Club Article – 23 March 2007

1952 births
Living people
Australian rules footballers from Perth, Western Australia
Subiaco Football Club players
Richmond Football Club players
Richmond Football Club Premiership players
Melbourne Football Club coaches
Norwood Football Club players
Norwood Football Club coaches
Woodville-West Torrens Football Club coaches
All-Australian coaches
Two-time VFL/AFL Premiership players